Vince Danielsen (born November 26, 1971) is a former professional Canadian football receiver for the Calgary Stampeders of the Canadian Football League from 1994 to 2001. He was selected third overall in the bonus round of the 1994 Canadian College Draft.
Danielsen was a West Division All-Star two times and was the Grey Cup Most Valuable Canadian in 1998, and won another Grey Cup title in his last season in 2001. He played CIS football for the UBC Thunderbirds.

In 1998, Danielsen opened a private training studio in Calgary known as Innovative Fitness  In 2006, this became known as the Innovative Fitness and Health Group.

At the age of 14, Danielsen was diagnosed with non-Hodgkin's lymphoma.  He has focused on childhood cancer as a charitable cause in Calgary, both by fund raising and in hospital support.
With fund raising his company has donated over $625,000 through a Train the Trainer event, all proceeds benefiting The Kids Cancer Care Foundation to support all kids facing childhood cancer.

References 

1971 births
Calgary Stampeders players
Canadian football slotbacks
Canadian people of Norwegian descent
Living people
Players of Canadian football from British Columbia
Canadian football people from Vancouver
UBC Thunderbirds football players